Schistophleps albida is a moth in the family Erebidae. It was described by Francis Walker in 1864. It is found in Australia (Queensland, New South Wales) and New Guinea.

The wingspan is about 20 mm. Adults are white with brown markings and two black dots on the forewings.

A larva was recorded hanging on a silken thread from Olea europea. It might feed on the foliage of this tree, but may also feed on algae growing on the trunk. The larvae are grey with yellow spots. Full-grown larvae reach a length of about 10 mm.

References

Moths described in 1864
Nudariina